Streptomyces speibonae is a bacterium species from the genus of Streptomyces which has been isolated from soil from Cape Town in South Africa. Streptomyces speibonae produces the antibiotic oxytetracycline.

See also 
 List of Streptomyces species

References

Further reading

External links
Type strain of Streptomyces speibonae at BacDive -  the Bacterial Diversity Metadatabase

speibonae
Bacteria described in 2003